7plus (stylised as 7+) is a video on demand, catch-up TV service run by the Seven Network. The service became available on 27 November 2017. 7plus also offers online live streaming of Channel 7, 7two, 7mate, 7Bravo, 7flix, Racing.com and 7Sport.

7plus is available across several platforms including Web, iOS and Android apps, FreeviewPlus certified TVs, Apple TV 4th Gen+, Fetch TV, Telstra TV, Chromecast, Android TV, Samsung TV, Sony Linux TV, PlayStation 4 and PlayStation 5.

History

2010–2017: PLUS7 

PLUS7 was a catch up TV service run by the Seven Network through its Yahoo7 joint venture with Yahoo!. The service became available on 18 January 2010.

Some titles were exclusively available in Australia on PLUS7, including Other Space and Sin City Saints, as well as the British version of My Kitchen Rules, which were not broadcast on the Seven Network. In 2014, PLUS7 became the first commercial television catch-up service to provide optional closed captioning on most of its programming.

PLUS7 was available across several platforms including iOS mobile operating systems (e.g. iPhone, iPad & iPod Touch), Apple TV, Xbox One, PlayStation 3, PlayStation 4, Windows 10, Sony internet-enabled TVs & Blu-ray players, LG internet-enabled TVs, Samsung internet-enabled TVs & Blu-ray players, Panasonic internet-enabled TVs, Hisense internet-enabled TVs, Humax set top boxes, Windows Mobile 7 & 8 and Samsung devices running Android OS 4.0+ and above.

2017–present: 7plus 
Following the acquisition of Yahoo! by Verizon Communications in June 2017, Seven announced plans to launch a wholly owned standalone service to replace PLUS7 within the following six months. In September 2017, Seven announced the new service would be known as 7plus and would launch in November 2017. With the introduction of 7plus, PLUS7 was shut down, becoming unavailable on most platforms from 12 December 2017, and on remaining devices on 31 March 2018.

In March 2019, the service added two American-based linear channels, Pac-12 Network and Outdoor Channel, as well as on-demand offerings from these providers.

On 23 July 2020, 7plus introduced a new logo styled as 7+.

On 4 August 2022, 7plus began airing Heartbreak Island, a reality television competition/contest, being deemed "too hot for TV".

Availability 

Through the streaming platform, 7plus provides access to the whole Seven Network
suite of channels, including the main and multi-channels.

As of October 2022, the following online only channels are also available:

 Ausbiz
 Bloomberg Television
 Bloomberg Quicktake
 Dust
 Fuel TV
 Gusto TV
 iwonder
 Love Nature
 Olympic Channel
 Outdoor Channel
 Pac-12 Network
 PeopleTV
 Qello Concerts by Stingray
 Stingray Classica
 Stingray Djazz
 Stingray Karaoke
 Stingray Naturescape
 Wicked Tuna
 Rialto Channel

There are also a number of virtual channels based on programming from Seven:

 A Country Practice
 All Saints
 Australian Drama
 Better Homes & Gardens
 Big Brother
 Blue Heelers
 Blue Light (Crime reality programming
 Border Security
 Global Champions Replays
 Medical & Rescue
 Nashville
 Property Dreams
 SAS Australia
 Supercars Replays
 This Week on 7 AFL
 Travel Australia
 Wicked Tuna
 WSL

Logos

Slogans 

2020–2022: Discover Something New2022–present: Stream Big

See also

Internet television in Australia
List of Internet television providers
List of streaming media services

References

External links

Seven Network
Video on demand services
Australian streaming companies
2017 establishments in Australia
Internet properties established in 2017
PlayStation 4 software